Fundamental Films is a Chinese film production company and distributor based in Shanghai and founded in 2008. In September 2016 it was announced the company had acquired a stake of 27.9% in French film company EuropaCorp, becoming the second-largest shareholder in the company.

Filmography

The Transporter Refueled (2015)
The Precipice Game (2016)
Nine Lives (2016)
The Warriors Gate (2016)
Super Express (2016)
Valerian and the City of a Thousand Planets (2017)
24 Hours to Live (2017)
Replicas (2018)
Outlaws Inc. (TBA)
The Black Chamber (TBA)

References

Film production companies of China
Companies based in Shanghai
Film distributors of China
Entertainment companies established in 2008
Chinese companies established in 2008